Redd's Pond is a pond located in Marblehead, Massachusetts. It was named after Wilmot Redd.

Salem Witchcraft Trials

In 1692, in Salem Village (now Danvers), several hysterical girls were said to have been “afflicted” by witchcraft. Wilmot Redd was among those accused. She was a crusty old woman, not popular with the womenfolk. Married to fisherman Samuel Redd, local fisherman knew her as “Mammy  Red.”

A warrant for her arrest was issued in Salem, signed by Magistrates Jonathan Corwin and John Hathorne. On May 31, Wilmot was taken to Salem Village for a preliminary examination. She was indicted and then placed in the Salem jail.

Four months later, the trial was held in Salem Towne. She denied the charges, but was allowed no defense counsel. On September 17, she was condemned to hang. Four days later, she and seven others were executed in Salem, on Gallows Hill or a nearby hill.

Wimot Redd was the only Marblehead citizen executed for witchcraft. Her small house was next to Old Burial Hill, on the southeast corner of the pond that now bears her name.

References

Ponds of Massachusetts
Bodies of water of Essex County, Massachusetts